Gladys Alicia Mora Romero (born July 31, 1980, in Barranquila) is a Colombian taekwondo practitioner. She is a two-time Olympian, and a four-time medalist at the Pan American Taekwondo Championships. She also won a bronze medal for the 51 kg class at the 2006 Central American and Caribbean Games in Cartagena, Colombia.

Mora made her official debut for the 2004 Summer Olympics in Athens, where she competed in the women's flyweight category (49 kg). She first defeated Indonesia's Juana Wangsa Putri by a superiority decision in the preliminary rounds, before losing out her next match to Chinese Taipei's Chen Shih-Hsin, with a sudden death score of 0–1. Because her opponent advanced further into the final match, Mora took advantage of the repechage rounds by defeating Nepal's Sangina Baidya and Guatemala's Euda Carías. She progressed to the bronze medal match, but narrowly lost the medal to Thailand's Yaowapa Boorapolchai, with a score of 1–2.

At the 2008 Summer Olympics, Mora qualified for the second time in the women's 49 kg class, after winning the championship title from the Pan American Qualification Tournament in Cali, Colombia. Unfortunately, she lost the first preliminary round match to another Chinese Taipei taekwondo practitioner Yang Shu-Chun, with a score of 0–(-1).

References

External links

NBC Olympics Profile

Results

Medal count

Results international 

Colombian female taekwondo practitioners
1980 births
Living people
Olympic taekwondo practitioners of Colombia
Taekwondo practitioners at the 2004 Summer Olympics
Taekwondo practitioners at the 2008 Summer Olympics
Sportspeople from Barranquilla
Central American and Caribbean Games silver medalists for Colombia
Competitors at the 2006 Central American and Caribbean Games
Central American and Caribbean Games medalists in taekwondo
20th-century Colombian women
21st-century Colombian women